James Hubbard, 5th Baron Addington (3 November 1930 – 26 June 1982), was a British peer. The son of John Francis Hubbard, he succeeded to the barony on the death of his cousin, who had died without a male heir.

He married Alexandra Patricia Millar on 7 October 1961. They had the following children:
Frances Linden Hubbard (b. 26 Jul 1962)
Dominic Bryce Hubbard, 6th Baron Addington (b. 24 Aug 1963)
Michael Walter Leslie Hubbard (b. 6 Jul 1965)
Sally-Anne Hubbard (b. 19 Oct 1966)

Arms

References

1930 births
1982 deaths
James
British South Africa Police officers